Prekopa may refer to:

 Prekopa, Međimurje County, a village near Štrigova, Croatia
 Prekopa, Sisak-Moslavina County, a village near Glina, Croatia
 Prekopa, Slovenia, a settlement in the Municipality of Vransko, Slovenia